Östergren is a Swedish surname. Notable people with the surname include:

 Klas Östergren (born 1955), Swedish writer
 Maria Östergren (born 1978), Swedish cyclist
 Mary Ostergren (born 1960), American biathlete
 Nestor Östergren (1890 – 1970), Swedish Olympic rower
 Petra Östergren (born 1965), Swedish feminist writer

Swedish-language surnames